1896–97 Hongkong Challenge Shield was the 2nd season of Hong Kong Challenge Shield, the now existing oldest football tournament in Asia.

Fixtures and results

First round
The draw of first round was made on 4 December 1896.

Second round
The draw of second round was made on 11 January 1897.

Semi-finals
The draw of semi-finals was made on 1 March 1897.

Final
The match was scheduled playing on 20 March 1897, but later was postponed to 23 March 1897.

References

The China Mail in 1897 may be read through Hong Kong Public Libraries - MultiMedia Information System on the Internet.

1896-97
1896 in Hong Kong
1897 in Hong Kong
1896 in association football
1897 in association football
Hong Kong Senior Challenge Shield